Maarten Gerritszoon Vries, or Fries, also referred to as de Vries, (18 February 1589, Harlingen, Netherlands – late 1647, at sea near Manila) was a 17th-century Dutch cartographer and explorer, the first Western European to leave an account of his visit to Ezo, Sakhalin, Kuril Islands and the Sea of Okhotsk.

Not much is known about the life of de Vries. He was probably born in Harlingen, Netherlands, in 1589 and spent many years in Taiwan. He is best remembered for his 1643 expedition to the north-western Pacific Ocean to discover the coast of Tartaria, on account of Anthony van Diemen, the governor in Batavia. This was the second expedition to look for legendary gold and silver islands in the Pacific, which nobody had discovered, after a failed expedition in 1639 under command of Matthijs Quast.

De Vries expedition
The two ships, the Castricum under De Vries and the Breskens under Hendrick Cornelisz Schaep left Batavia, the capital of Dutch Java, in February 1643.  After a stop in Ternate in the Moluccas they continued their journey on April 4. On May 20 the two ships lost touch with each other in a storm, while off Hachijo Shima, an island some 290 km south of Edo, which, due to this setback, was christened Ongeluckich, or "Unlucky", Island by the Dutch.

Breskens in Yamada
The Breskens arrived in a promising bay and was received friendly by the population of Yamada on Tohoku, Japan. Six weeks later the Breskens again sailed to Yamada, probably while they had a good time. In the evening they organized a party with a samurai and most probably some Japanese women. (It is not known what exactly happened, because the diary got lost in 1692, after Nicolaes Witsen received it.) The next day, July 29, ten members of the crew, including the captain were invited by the women to come to a farm where they would receive fresh vegetables and fish. The unarmed crew was offered sake and rice, but captured, and sent to Morioka and Edo for interrogation. The Japanese feared Portuguese / Spanish Jesuits had come to land. As a result, bakufu officials were extremely anxious about the problem of coastal defenses. However, after it was understood that the crew were Dutch merchants and not Catholics, the problem to be solved became one of deciding by which procedure the Dutch should be released. After Jan van Elserac had arrived the shōgun Tokugawa Iemitsu sent them in December to Deshima. The crew had to wait nine months for the next ship to Taiwan while the Breskens had left Honshu already at the end of July (without a captain) searching for the Gold and Silver Islands.

Castricum going north
In the summer of 1643, the Castricum sailed by the southern Kuril Islands, visiting Kunashir, Iturup (which they named "Staten Island", although nowadays this name is only used to refer to Staten Island, in New York City), and Urup, where they met with the Ainu, and which they named "Company Island" and claimed for the Netherlands.

The Castricum passed between the islands of Iturup and Urup, the strait between the islands being later named Vries Strait after its discoverer, and entered the Sea of Okhotsk.

The Dutch sailed north, without encountering any land, until being driven south-west toward the northern shores of Hokkaido. Then they sailed north again, visiting Cape Aniwa (the southeastern tip of Sakhalin Island), Gulf of Patience (where they indeed had to be patient, waiting for the fog to clear), and Cape Patience east of it. At these places they met and communicated through sign language with the indigenous Ainu people of the island.

After another excursion, now east into the Pacific, the Castricum returned to Japanese waters and managed to meet with the Breskens off Kyushu. The two ships sailed to Fort Zeelandia (Taiwan) and returned to Batavia in mid-December 1643.

Battles of La Naval de Manila
Maarten Gerritsz Vries died on board from disease after leading an unsuccessful attempt to invade the Philippines.

Sources

External links
 

1589 births
1646 deaths
Dutch explorers of the Pacific
17th-century Dutch explorers
Sakhalin
Kuril Islands
Sailors on ships of the Dutch East India Company
People from Harlingen, Netherlands
17th-century Dutch cartographers
Maritime history of the Dutch East India Company
Dutch people of the Eighty Years' War (United Provinces)
Explorers from the Dutch Republic